Nandapur Milani Balika Vidyaniketan is a Bengali medium secondary school for  girls situated in Chandipur (community development block), Purba Medinipur district, West Bengal, India. The school is not far from the Baraghuni Hospital. Most of the students of the school are from local places especially from the village. It was established in 1967. Student strength is about 225. The school is situated in Chandipur (Vidhan Sabha constituency) and Kanthi (Lok Sabha constituency) and run by the West Bengal Board of Secondary Education.

History
The school was established in 1967. Previously it was an upper-primary school. In 2003 it became a secondary school.

Teaching staff
Headmistress
 Rekha Paul Sinha

Language group
 Sunanda Maity Bej,
 Banashree Mandal,
 Parvati Manda.

Science group
 Swapna Bhaumik,
 Trishantika Sarkar,
 Vacant

Humanities group
 Manorama Das Seth,
 Vacant

Work Education and Physical Education Group
 Namita Das,
 Vacant

Non-teaching staff
Clerk
 Bikash Chandra Seth,

Group D
 Malati Das, Class-VIII

Infrastructure
The school contain six classrooms, three admin rooms, one library and one playing ground.

See also
Education in India
List of schools in India
Education in West Bengal

References

External links

High schools and secondary schools in West Bengal
Girls' schools in West Bengal
Schools in Purba Medinipur district
Educational institutions established in 1967
1967 establishments in West Bengal